The Naismith Memorial Basketball Hall of Fame honors players who have shown exceptional skill at basketball, all-time great coaches, referees, and other major contributors to the sport. Located in Springfield, Massachusetts, the Basketball Hall of Fame is named after James Naismith, who invented the sport in 1891; he was inducted into the Hall as a contributor in 1959. The Coach category has existed since the beginning of the Hall of Fame. For a person to be inducted to the Basketball Hall of Fame as a coach, they must either be "fully retired for five years" or, if they are still active, "have coached as either a fulltime assistant or head coach on the high school and/or college and/or professional level" for 25 years.

As part of the inaugural class of 1959, three coaches were inducted (Forrest C. "Phog" Allen, Henry Clifford Carlson and Walter E. Meanwell); in total, 100 individuals have been inducted into the Hall of Fame as coaches.

Six coaching inductees were associated with teams that were inducted to the Hall of Fame as units. Don Haskins, inducted in 1997, was the coach of the 1966 Texas Western basketball team, which was inducted in 2007. Dutch Lonborg, inducted in 1973, was manager of the 1960 U.S. Olympic team that was inducted in 2010. Three coaching inductees were members of the staff for the 1992 U.S. Olympic team that was also inducted in 2010—head coach Chuck Daly (1994) and assistants Lenny Wilkens (1998) and Mike Krzyzewski (2001). Cathy Rush (2008) was the head coach of the Immaculata College women's team of 1972–1974 that was inducted in 2014.

Ten of the inducted coaches were born outside the United States: Cesare Rubini, Aleksandr J. Gomelsky, Antonio Díaz-Miguel, Aleksandar "Aza" Nikolić, Geno Auriemma, Alessandro "Sandro" Gamba, Mirko Novosel, Pedro Ferrándiz, Lidia Alexeeva, and Lindsay Gaze. Ten of the inducted coaches are women: L. Margaret Wade, Jody Conradt, Pat Head Summitt, Sandra Kay Yow, Sue Gunter, Rush, C. Vivian Stringer, Tara VanDerveer, Alexeeva, and Sylvia Hatchell. Four coaches have also been inducted as players: John Wooden, Bill Sharman, Wilkens, and Tom Heinsohn. One of the more recent inductees in this category was John McLendon, who was inducted as a head coach in 2016. McLendon had also been inducted as a contributor in 1979, making him the first individual ever to be inducted as both a coach and contributor.

Unlike recent years (such as 2015), in which individuals directly elected by special Hall committees were announced separately from the rest of the class, all 2016 inductees were announced at the same event. Specifically, the announcement of the class of 2016 was made on April 4 during the festivities surrounding the 2016 NCAA Men's Final Four in Houston.

Coaches

Notes
 According to individuals' pages on the official website

References
General – Naismith Memorial Hall of Fame inductees

General – Other groups of coaches
10 Greatest Euroleague Coaches – 
Women's Basketball Hall of Fame inductees – 

Specific

 
Nais
Nais